Matt's Gallery is a contemporary art gallery currently located in Nine Elms at 6 Charles Clowes Walk, London, SW11 7AN. Its director, Robin Klassnik OBE, opened the gallery in 1979 in his studio on Martello Street, before moving premises to Copperfield Road, Mile End in 1993. The gallery is named after Klassnik’s dog, Matt E. Mulsion.

In 2022 Matt's Gallery moved to its new  permanent space in Nine Elms, Battersea as part of Wandsworth Council's cultural strategy.

History
Among the artists represented by Matt's Gallery are Willie Doherty, a 1994 and 2003 Turner Prize nominee, Susan Hiller, Richard Grayson, Graham Fagen, Nathaniel Mellors, 2001 and 2007 Turner Prize nominee Mike Nelson, Benedict Drew, Imogen Stidworthy and Lindsay Seers. They have also exhibited many female artists including, Melanie Counsell, Emma Hart and Susan Hiller. In 2009 Mellors, Nelson and Seers exhibited at Tate Britain in the Tate Triennial and in 2011 Susan Hiller had a major retrospective at Tate Britain. Nathaniel Mellors and Erkka Nissinen represented Finland in the 2017 Venice Biennale and Imogen Stidworthy was selected for Documenta 12 in 2007. Stidworthy and Drew were also both selected for the British Art Show 8 in 2016-2017.

Robin Klassnik was awarded an OBE for services to the arts and media in 2014. Matt’s Gallery was short-listed for the Prudential Award for the Visual Arts in 1996 along with Bookworks and South London Gallery. Robin Klassnik was also short-listed for Prudential/Arts Council Award in 1994 for an individual contribution to innovation and creativity in the Arts.

In 2016 Matt's Gallery successfully applied for charitable status, allowing it to receive funds from a broad range of charities and agencies. As a National Portfolio Organisation, Matt’s Gallery receives revenue funding from Arts Council England and the programme is frequently supported by the Henry Moore Foundation, Outset Contemporary Art Fund and The Foyle Foundation amongst others.

Matt's Gallery currently resides at 92 Webster Road, home to Ron Henocq Fine Art. The gallery ran twenty short-form (ten day) exhibitions in its 3x3x3m cube gallery space in 2018, designed by architect Tomas Klassnik. In the lead up to its move to Nine Elms, anticipated in 2019-2020, Matt's Gallery presented Richard Grayson's 'By Our Own Hand', a textiles-based project working with the Wandsworth community.

See also 
Art group
List of Turner Prize winners and nominees

References

External links 
Matt's Gallery

Contemporary art galleries in London
Art galleries established in 1979
1979 establishments in England